Cape Granat is a cape in the western part of the Thala Hills,  northeast of Campbell Glacier, on the coast of Enderby Land, Antarctica. Molodezhnaya Station is just south of the cape. This feature was mapped and called "Mys Granat" (Cape Garnet) by the Soviet Antarctic Expedition, 1961–62.

References

Headlands of Enderby Land